Ergys is an Albanian masculine given name and may refer to:
Ergys Kaçe (born 1993), Albanian footballer
Ergys Kuçi (born 1993), Albanian footballer
Ergys Sorra (born 1989), Albanian footballer

Albanian masculine given names